The Open University (OU) is a British public research university and the largest university in the United Kingdom by number of students. The majority of the OU's undergraduate students are based in the United Kingdom and principally study off-campus; many of its courses (both undergraduate and postgraduate) can also be studied anywhere in the world. There are also a number of full-time postgraduate research students based on the  university campus in Milton Keynes, where they use the staff facilities for research, as well as more than 1,000 members of academic and research staff and over 2,500 administrative, operational and support staff.

The OU was established in 1969 and was initially based at Alexandra Palace, north London, using the television studios and editing facilities which had been vacated by the BBC. The first students enrolled in January 1971. The university administration is now based at Walton Hall, Milton Keynes, in Buckinghamshire, but has administration centres in other parts of the United Kingdom. It also has a presence in other European countries. The university awards undergraduate and postgraduate degrees, as well as non-degree qualifications such as diplomas and certificates or continuing education units. It also offers unique Open Degrees, in which students may study any combination of modules across all subjects.

With more than  205,420 students enrolled, including around 34% of new undergraduates aged under 25 and more than 8,802 overseas students, it is the largest academic institution in the United Kingdom (and one of the largest in Europe) by student number, and qualifies as one of the world's largest universities. Since it was founded, more than 2 million students have studied its courses. The Open University is one of only two United Kingdom higher education institutions to gain accreditation in the United States of America by the Middle States Commission on Higher Education, an institutional accrediting agency, recognised by the United States Secretary of Education and the Council for Higher Education Accreditation. The BSc (Honours) Computing and IT course is accredited by BCS, the Chartered Institute for IT and quality assured by the European Quality Assurance Network for Informatics Education (EQANIE).

The OU won the Teaching Excellence and Digital Innovation categories in The Guardian University Awards 2018. In 2018–19 the OU had a £2.77 billion impact on the UK economy. It also produces more CEOs than any other UK university, including universities such as Oxford, Cambridge, University College London and the London School of Economics. Former UK Prime Minister Gordon Brown, astrophysicist Jocelyn Bell Burnell, broadcaster Anna Ford and actress Glenda Jackson are among a host of well-known names who have tutored for the OU.

History 

The Open University was founded by the Labour government under Prime Minister Harold Wilson. Wilson was a strong advocate, using the vision of Michael Young. Planning commenced in 1965 under Minister of State for Education Jennie Lee, who established a model for the OU as one of widening access to the highest standards of scholarship in higher education, and set up a planning committee consisting of university vice-chancellors, educationalists and television broadcasters, chaired by Sir Peter Venables. The British Broadcasting Corporation (BBC) Assistant Director of Engineering at the time James Redmond, had obtained most of his qualifications at night school, and his natural enthusiasm for the project did much to overcome the technical difficulties of using television to broadcast teaching programmes.

Wilson envisaged The Open University as a major marker in the Labour Party's commitment to modernising British society. He believed that it would help build a more competitive economy while also promoting greater equality of opportunity and social mobility. The planned use of television and radio to broadcast its courses was also supposed to link The Open University to the technological revolution under way, which Wilson saw as a major ally of his modernisation schemes. However, from the start, Lee encountered widespread scepticism and even opposition from within and without the Labour Party, including senior officials in the Department of Education and Science (DES), her departmental head Anthony Crosland, the Treasury, ministerial colleagues, such as Richard Crossman and commercial broadcasters. The Open University was realised due to Lee's unflagging determination and tenacity in 1965–67, the steadfast support from Wilson, and the fact that the anticipated costs, as reported to Lee and Wilson by Arnold Goodman, seemed very modest. By the time the actual, much higher costs became apparent, it was too late to scrap the fledgling university. The university was granted a royal charter by the Privy Council on 23 April 1969.

Organisation and administration

Staff 

The majority of staff are part-time associate lecturers and, as of the 2009–10 academic year, almost 8,000 work for the OU. There are also 1,286 (mostly full-time) salaried academic employees (central academics based at Walton Hall and staff tutors based in a variety of regional locations) who are research active and responsible for the production and presentation of teaching materials, 1,931 who are academic-related and 1,902 support staff (including secretaries and technicians).  Salaries are the OU's main cost—over £275 million for the 2009–2010 academic year. In 2010 the OU became one of the Sunday Times Best Places to Work in the Public Sector.

Credit union 
Open University Employees Credit Union is a savings and loans co-operative established by the university for staff in 1994. A member of the Association of British Credit Unions, it is authorised by the Prudential Regulation Authority and regulated by the Financial Conduct Authority and the PRA. Ultimately, like the banks and building societies, members’ savings are protected against business failure by the Financial Services Compensation Scheme.

Academic divisions

Faculties 

In 2016, the university reorganised its departments and now operates with the Faculties of Arts & Social Sciences (FASS); the Faculty of Business and Law (FBL); the Faculty of Science, Technology, Engineering and Mathematics (STEM); and the Faculty of Wellbeing, Education, Languages and Sport (WELS). It also runs Open and Access programmes via PVC-Students, and programmes from the Institute of Educational Technology (IET) via WELS.

Business school 
In 1982, Open University offered a course titled, "The Effective Manager", developed by a team that was led by Charles Handy. After the reported success of the course, Derek S. Pugh proposed the establishment of a business school. In 1988, the Open University Business School (OUBS) was founded by the Faculty of Management department, for which professor Andrew Thomson was appointed to head. Thomson's main goal was the offering of an MBA programme, which was eventually funded through a grant from the DES. In 1989, the first class of MBA students were enrolled.

The Open University Business School is accredited by the international accrediting bodies AACSB, AMBA, and EQUIS. It was placed in the top 1% of UK business schools after having received Triple Crown accreditation.

Some selected rankings:

 The OU Business School's MBA programme was ranked 13th in the Financial Times’ global rankings of online and distance learning MBA providers which featured five European schools, four of which were in the UK.
 Ranked fifth in the Global Online MBA Rankings by CEO Magazine and 1st for UK institutions (2019)
 Ranked sixth in the world for the QS Distance Online MBA Rankings (2016)

Singapore Institute of Management Open University Centre
From 1992 to 2005, the Singapore Institute of Management (SIM) ran the Open University Degree Programme (OUDP), in collaboration with The Open University, United Kingdom (OUUK), which was renamed the Singapore Institute of Management's Open University Centre (SIM-OUC) as one of SIM's autonomous entity. In 2005, after SIM formed SIM University (UniSIM), it took over SIM-OUC students and granted those who graduated in 2006 a choice between a UniSIM or OUUK degree.

Academic profile

Teaching methods 

The OU uses a variety of methods for teaching, including written and audio materials, the Internet, disc-based software and television programmes on DVD. Course-based television broadcasts by the BBC, which started on 3 January 1971, ceased on 15 December 2006.  Materials comprise originally authored work by in-house and external academic contributors, and from third-party materials licensed for use by OU students. For most modules, students are supported by tutors ("associate lecturers") who provide feedback on their work and are generally available to them at face-to-face tutorials, by telephone, and/or on the Internet. A number of short courses worth ten credits are now available that do not have an assigned tutor but offer an online conferencing service (Internet forum) where help and advice are offered through conferencing "moderators".

Some modules have mandatory day schools. Nevertheless, it is possible to be excused on the basis of ill health (or other extenuating circumstances) and many courses have no mandatory face-to-face component. Similarly, some modules have traditionally offered week-long summer schools offering an opportunity for students to remove themselves from the general distractions of their life and focus on their studies for a short time.

Over the past ten years the university has adopted a policy of separating residential modules from distance-full-time taught modules. Exemption from attendance at residential schools, always as an Alternative Learning Experience (ALE), is sometimes available for disabled students and others who find it impossible to attend in person (See "Qualifications-Undergraduate" section.)

For many years the OU produced television and radio programmes aimed at bringing learning to a wider audience. In its early years, most of these were in the form of documentaries or filmed lectures. Latterly, most OU-associated programming was mainstream and broadcast in peak hours, including series such as Rough Science and "Battle of the Geeks", while older-style programming was carried in the BBC Learning Zone.

In 2004 the OU announced it was to stop its late-night programmes on BBC Two, and the last programme was broadcast at 5.30 am on 16 December 2006. The OU now plans to focus on semi-academic television programmes, such as many now broadcast on BBC Four.

The Quality Assurance Agency for Higher Education review published in December 2015 found five areas of good practice and made three recommendations for improvement. The English national survey of student satisfaction has twice put the Open University in first place.

In October 2006, the OU joined the open educational resources movement with the launch of OpenLearn. A growing selection of current and past distance learning course materials will be released for free access, including downloadable versions for educators to modify (under the Creative Commons BY-NC-SA licence), plus free collaborative learning-support tools.

In the early 2000s, the OU researched the use of virtual worlds in teaching and learning, and had two main islands in Second Life. In May 2009 these regions formed the basis of a case study by Linden Lab, the company which owns Second Life.

In mid-2010, the university led the list of contributing universities in the number of downloads of its material from the educational resources site iTunes U, with downloads of over 20 million. Open University continues to adopt Moodle as the Virtual Learning Environment (VLE) with their own team deploying custom plugins.

In 2013, the OU began a massive open online course (MOOC) platform called FutureLearn, which is the UK's largest provider of free online courses.

Assessment methods 

Open University modules are often assessed using an equal weighting of examinations and coursework. The coursework component normally takes the form of between two and seven tutor-marked assignments (TMAs) and, occasionally, may also include up to six multiple-choice or "missing word" 10-question interactive computer-marked assignments (iCMAs). The examinable component is usually an invigilated three-hour paper regardless of the size of the module (although on some modules it can be up to three three-hour papers), but an increasing number of modules instead have an EMA (End of Module Assessment) which is similar to a TMA, in that it is completed at home, but is regarded as an exam for grading purposes.

Modules results are sometimes issued on a graded basis, consisting of pass grades 1 (threshold 85%, a distinction), 2 (70–84%), 3 (55–69%) & 4 (40–54%), and fail (below 40%). This grade is calculated as the lower of the overall continuous assessment score (OCAS) and overall examination score (OES).

These grades can be weighted according to their level, and combined to calculate the classification of a degree. An undergraduate degree will weigh level 3 modules twice as much as level 2, and in postgraduate programmes, all M-level modules are equally weighted.

Qualifications

Undergraduate 
Open University modules have associated with them a number of Credit Accumulation and Transfer Scheme (CATS) credits – usually 30 or 60 – depending on the quantity of the material in the module and a level (1, 2, 3, or 4) corresponding to the complexity, with 120 credits roughly equating to the year of study for a full-time student.

The OU offers a large number of undergraduate qualifications, including certificates, diplomas, and bachelor's degrees, based on both level and quantity of study. An OU undergraduate degree requires 300 (or 360 for honours) CATS credits.

Students are generally advised not to undertake more than 60 credits per year, meaning that an undergraduate degree will take typically six years to complete. With the exception of some degrees in fast-moving areas (such as computing), there is generally no limit on the time that a student may take. Students need special permission to take more than 120 credits (equivalent to full-time study) at any time; such permission is not usually granted.

Originally the BA was the only undergraduate degree, and it was unnamed. The modern OU grants degrees of Bachelor of Arts (BA), Science (BSc), Laws (LLB) and Engineering (BEng); the BA and BSc may be named (following a specified syllabus) or unnamed (constructed of courses chosen by the student) degrees.

Many OU faculties have now introduced short modules worth ten credits. Most of these modules are taught online and start at regular intervals throughout the year. They typically provide an introduction to a broader subject over a period of ten weeks, these are generally timed during vacations at conventional universities in order to take advantage of their facilities. Some science modules, which require only home study, are complemented by residential courses, in order to allow the student to gain practical laboratory experience in that field; typically, an award of a degree or diploma will require completion of both.

Different modules are run at different times of the year, but, typically, a 30 or 60-credit module will run either from October to June or from February to October. Assessment is by both continual assessment (with, normally, between four and eight assignments during the year) and, for most, a final examination or, on some modules, a major assignment.

Open degree 

As well as degrees in named subjects, the Open University also grants multidisciplinary "Open" degrees. Open degrees provide students with access to a wide variety of subjects to develop a personalised curriculum to meet their vocational needs and personal interests. The Open degree may be awarded as a Bachelor of Arts Open, a Bachelor of Science Open (either with or without honours), a Master of Arts Open or a Master of Science Open.

The Open degree is the most popular qualification at the university. Around 20,000 students are enrolled in this programme, which makes the Open University the UK's largest multidisciplinary education provider. As of 2018, over 236,000 alumni have graduated with an Open degree.

Other qualifications 
The Open University grants undergraduate Certificates (abbreviated Cert) typically awarded after 60 completed credits at Level 1 or Level 3 (where each credit corresponds to roughly 10 hours of study, therefore 60 credits represent about 600 hours of effort), Diplomas (abbreviated Dip) after 120 credits – typically 60 credits at Level 2 and 60 credits at Level 3. Open University also awards Foundation degrees (abbreviated FD).

OU also offers a limited number of CertHE (120 CATS) and DipHE (240 CATS).

Postgraduate 
The Open University provides the opportunity to study for a PhD on a part-time distance, or a full-time basis (on-site for science subjects and most social sciences, off-site with some supervisions on-site for arts) in a wide range of disciplines as well as an EdD for professionals in education. Since 2019 the Open University has also offered a professional doctorate for healthcare workers. The university offers a range of Master's levels modules such as the MBA and MPA, MSc, MA and MEd, and MRes, and a number of postgraduate diplomas and certificates including innovative practice-based modules and postgraduate computing qualifications for professionals. Postgraduate certificates are awarded for 60 credits of study on specified modules; postgraduate diplomas are awarded for 120 credits of study on specified modules. The university offers "Advanced Diplomas" that involve 60 credits at the undergraduate level and 60 credits at the postgraduate level – these are designed as "bridges" between undergraduate and postgraduate study.

Its master's degrees in the field of engineering are accredited to support registration as a Chartered Engineer, the highest level of engineering professional registration in the United Kingdom.

Degree ceremonies 

Unlike most United Kingdom universities, degree ceremonies at the Open University are not graduation ceremonies as such (the occasion on which degrees are formally conferred on those who have achieved substantive degrees)—although honours degrees are also normally conferred on these occasions. The Open University degree ceremony is officially known as a "Presentation of Graduates" at which those who have already had a degree bestowed on them are presented to the University Chancellor or his/her representative. Open University graduates normally graduate in absentia at a joint meeting of the university's council and senate ("congregation") which takes place at a meeting entirely separate from the degree ceremony.

The university's degree ceremonies occur throughout the year at various prestigious auditorium venues located throughout the United Kingdom, plus one each in Ireland and Continental Western Europe. In the year 2010 the OU held 26 degree ceremonies including Dublin, Manchester, Glasgow, Ely and Versailles. These ceremonies are presided over by a senior academic at the Pro-Vice-Chancellor level or higher, and have the normal formal rituals associated with a graduation ceremony, including academic dress, procession and university mace.

Academic dress 
Academic dress for the Open University is based on the colours blue and gold (yellow). No headwear is worn at degree ceremonies.

In the year 2000, the Open University was the first to host an online "virtual" graduation ceremony in the United Kingdom together with an audience at the OU's campus in Milton Keynes. Twenty-six students in eight countries, from the United States of America to Hong Kong, were presented for their master's degrees in online graduation, including, from the Massachusetts Institute of Technology (MIT) – Tim Berners-Lee, one of the founders of the World Wide Web, who was conferred an honorary doctorate.

Rankings
The university is included in major world university rankings such as Times Higher Education World University Rankings, U.S. News & World Report and Academic Ranking of World Universities.

The OU ranked in the top third of UK universities in the Research Excellence Framework (REF) 2014 using the Times Higher Education Power Score.

The Open University ranked third in National Student Survey 2021 achieving 88.24% for overall student satisfaction.

Research 
Like other UK universities, the OU actively engages in research. The OU's Planetary and Space Sciences Research Institute has become particularly well known to the public through its involvement in space missions. In October 2006, the Cassini-Huygens mission including 15 people from the OU received the 2006 "Laurels for Team Achievement Award" from the International Academy of Astronautics (IAA). Cassini-Huygens' successful completion of its seven-year, two billion-mile journey in January 2005 to Saturn ended with Huygens landing farther away from Earth than any previous probe or craft in the history of space exploration. The first instrument to touch Saturn's moon Titan was the Surface Science Package containing nine sensors to investigate the physical properties of Titan's surface. It was built by a team at the OU led by Professor John Zarnecki.

The OU employs over 500 people engaged in research in over 25 areas, and there are over 1,200 research students. It spends approximately £20 million each year on research, around £6 million from the Higher Education Funding Council for England, and the remainder from external funders. 

The Open University also runs the Open Research Online (ORO) website. ORO is a collection of over 40,000 open-access research outputs across a broad range of research areas.

The Open University produced in collaboration with Springer Nature the Computer Science Ontology, which is a large-scale automatically generated taxonomy of research topics in the field of Computer Science.

OpenScience Observatories 
The OU operates a collection of telescopes and other instruments at the Observatorio del Teide, Tenerife. Its facilities compromise the COmpletely Autonomous Service Telescope (COAST), the Physics Innovations Robotic Telescope Explorer (PIRATE) and an associated weather station. At the Open University campus in Milton Keynes researches operate a radio telescope – ARROW (A Robotic Radio telescope Over the Web).

Students 
In the 2019–20 academic year, there were 175,719 enrolled students.

Demographics

In 2019/20, 99,834 students were from England, 14,903 were from Scotland, 6,668 from Wales, 3,667 from Northern Ireland and 4,900 from the European Union, with others elsewhere. 60% of undergraduates were female, with 53% of those taking postgraduate modules being male. 22,664 of students in 2015–16 had declared disabilities.

According to The Guardian, a cross-sector fall in the number of part-time students was accelerated in 2012 when tuition fees rose and there was limited financial support for part-time students. The Open University saw a 30% drop in part-time students between 2010–11 and 2015–16. Enrollment numbers show a tremendous difference from 2009–2010 to 2016–2017.

While most of those studying are mature students, an increasingly large proportion of new undergraduates are aged between 17 and 25, to the extent that in 2010/11 the OU had more students in this age range than any other UK university. In the 2003–2004 academic year around 20% of new undergraduates were under 25, up from 12.5% in 1996–1997 (the year before top-up fees were announced). In 2010 approximately 55% of those under 25 were also in full-time employment. In 2010, 29,000 undergraduates were in this age range. By 2011, 32,000 undergraduates were under 25 years old, representing around 25% of new students.  The majority of students in the 2015–16 academic year were aged between 25 and 34 years old, with the median age of new undergraduates being 28.

As of 2014, the OU's youngest graduate was a fifteen-year-old boy from Wales who gained a BSc with First Class Honours in 2014.

The OU works with some schools to introduce A-Level students to OU study and in 2009–10 3% of undergraduates were under 18 years old.

Courses 
Unlike other universities, where students register for a programme, OU students register separately for individual modules (which may be 30 or 60 CATS credits (and formerly available in 10, 15, or 20 credits), equivalent to 15 or 30 ECTS credits). These modules may then be linked to degree programmes.

During the 2009–10 academic year social studies was the most popular study area (with 16,381 full-time equivalent students), followed by biological and physical sciences (12,357) and historical and philosophical studies (8,686); student numbers even on smaller undergraduate programmes, such as creative arts and design are still significant (2,528) as are postgraduate registrations on programmes such as mass communications and documentation (123 full-time equivalent students).

The most popular module during 2009–10 was DD101 An introduction to the social sciences (7,512 students), followed by AA100 The Arts Past and Present, B120 An Introduction to Business Studies, K101 An Introduction to Health and Social Care and Y163 Starting with Psychology.

Fees and financial assistance 
17,634 students received financial assistance for their studies in 2015–16. The typical cost for United Kingdom-based students of a Bachelor's honours degree at the OU was between £3,780 and £5,130 in 2009–10. From September 2012 the Government reduced its funding for all students residing in England and fees went up to compensate. English students pay higher fees than those living in the rest of the United Kingdom. The average cost of one full-time year or 120 credits rose to £6,336 in 2021, bringing the cost of an average Bachelor's honours degree for an English student to £19,008. (European Union and international students pay more as the university does not receive government funding for them).  The most important revenue stream to the Open University is now academic fees paid by the students, which totalled about £157 million in 2009–10 and £248 million in 2015–16.

Qualifications awarded 
The university enrolled fewer than 50,000 students in the 1970–71 academic year, but it quickly exceeded that number by 1974–75. By 1987–88 yearly enrolment had doubled to 100,000 students, passing 200,000 by 2001–02 and 250,000 in 2009–10. Numbers fell when the fee regime changed.

Cumulatively, by the end of 2009–10, the OU had educated more than 1.5 million students and awarded 819,564 qualifications after successful assessment.

In addition, the Open University provides certification for qualifications at Ruskin College in Oxford and Richmond, the American International University in London, a private liberal arts institution. (Until 2008, it provided the same service for the University of the Highlands and Islands in Scotland).

Open University Students Association 
The Open University Students Association is the equivalent of a students' union for the Open University and is a registered charity wholly funded by the Open University (OU). The association is governed by a board of trustees and a Central Executive Committee. Each student registered with the OU automatically becomes part of the Students Association unless they elect to formally opt out. It offers opportunities to meet up, volunteer, find information and access services to support learning along with a range of student clubs and societies typical of those found in other UK Universities.

Notable current and former academics 

 Jocelyn Bell Burnell – astronomer
 Tim Benton – art historian
 Andrew Blowers – geographer
 Neil Chalmers – zoologist
 Catherine Cooke – architectural historian
 Nigel Cross – design researcher
 Katharine Ellis – music historian
 Dimitra Fimi – Tolkien scholar
 Monica Grady – meteoricist
 Brian Goodwin – biologist
 David Gow – composer
 Norman Gowar – mathematician
 Oswald Hanfling – philosopher
 Stuart Hall – social scientist
 Christopher Hill – historian
 Arthur Marwick – historian
 Doreen Massey – geographer
 Bob Moon – educationist
 John Naughton – technologist
 Oliver Penrose – mathematician
 Mike Pentz – physicist
 Colin Pillinger – planetary scientist
 Steven Rose – biologist
 David Gordon Scott - criminologist
 Russell Stannard – physicist
 Hilary Wainwright – sociologist
 Nigel Warburton – philosopher
 Clare Warren – geologist
 Margaret Wetherell – social psychologist
 Glenn White – astronomer
 Robin Wilson – mathematician
 John Zarnecki – space scientist

Notable alumni, graduates and honorees

In fiction 
The Open University has been featured in many films and television programmes. The plot of Educating Rita surrounds the working-class titular character aiming to "improve" herself by studying English literature. She attends private tutorials run by alcoholic lecturer Frank.

Television characters have also followed OU courses. These include Anne Bryce in the BBC sit-com Ever Decreasing Circles, Yvonne Sparrow in Goodnight Sweetheart and George Bulman in Bulman, in the ITV spin-off from the series Strangers. Sheila Grant (Sue Johnston) was accused of having an affair with her tutor in Brookside. Onslow, a character from Keeping up Appearances, watches Open University programming on television from time to time.

In autumn 2006, Lenny Henry was a star in Slings and Arrows, a one-off BBC television drama which he also wrote, about someone who falls in love while on an OU English Literature course. (Henry has himself completed an OU degree in English.)

In the 2006–07 TV series Life on Mars, Sam Tyler received messages from the real world via Open University programmes late at night.

Dorian Green from Birds of a Feather announced she had been accepted by the Open University to do a degree in psychology and began studying with the university in series 3.

In the 2016 novel Swing Time by Zadie Smith, the narrator's mother is a student at the Open University.

In the TV series Bottom, Eddie, Spudgun, and Dave Hedgehog watch TV while playing hide-and-seek with Ritchie. They fall asleep, leaving Ritchie in a cupboard until they finally awaken to an OU lecture on 'Medieval population distribution patterns in Lower Saxony'.

Partnerships

Armed Forces 
Through an agreement between the Ministry of Defence and the OU going back to the early 1970s, a wide range of courses is available to members of the British armed forces, with course materials supplied via the student's BFPO address. OU study centres have been established in Cyprus and Germany. Many have studied while on active service, even in conflict situations.

Partner institutions 
The Open University has a diverse network of partners across the globe. Once approved, partner institutions offer Open University validated awards, granted under the university's royal charter. As of October 2021, the Open University has over 40 international partners, including for example Union School of Theology, Regent's University London, York College, Belfast Metropolitan College, American College of Greece, Leeds City College and Ruskin College Oxford.

Doctoral training partnerships

The Grand Union 
The Grand Union is an ESRC Doctoral Training Partnership uniting The Open University, the University of Oxford and Brunel University London. The partnership is committed to a student-centred approach to training researchers, increasing access to postgraduate study, and advancing disciplinary and interdisciplinary research.

Open-Oxford-Cambridge AHRC Doctoral Training 
Open-Oxford-Cambridge AHRC Doctoral Training Partnership is a consortium of the Open University, University of Oxford and University of Cambridge providing funding and training for doctoral students in the arts and humanities.

Imperial-Cambridge-Open Centre for Doctoral Training 
From 2014 to 2022, the Open University is working with Imperial College London and the University of Cambridge to establish a new EPSRC-funded Centre for Doctoral Training (CDT) to develop skills in civil nuclear energy for global markets.

See also 
 Armorial of UK universities
 Futurelearn
 OpenLearn
 Open College of the Arts
 Open University Press
 List of Open University Alumni
 List of universities in the United Kingdom
 University of Hagen

Notes

References

Further reading 
 Dorey, Pete. "‘Well, Harold Insists on Having It!’—The Political Struggle to Establish The Open University, 1965–67." Contemporary British History 29#2 (2015): 241–272.
 Perry, Walter. "The Open University" Proceedings of the Royal Institution of Great Britain. (1971), Vol. 44 Issue 203, pp 95–112.
 Purvis, June. "Some problems of teaching and learning within the Open University." Educational Research 21#3 (1979): 163–177.
 Tunstall, Jeremy. The Open University Opens (1974).
 Dalgleish, Tim. Lifting It Off The Page: An Oral Portrait of OU People 1995, The Open University.

External links 

 
Parliament & the Sixties – Jennie Lee & The University of the Air – UK Parliament Living Heritage
 
 OpenLearn online learning from the Open University
 Video clip of BBC Open University programme circa 1982

 
Distance education institutions based in the United Kingdom
Alternative education
Charities based in Scotland
Exempt charities
Educational institutions established in 1969
Charities based in Buckinghamshire
1969 establishments in the United Kingdom
Credit unions of the United Kingdom
Open universities
Organisations based in Milton Keynes
Universities established in the 1960s
Universities UK